Mask of the Demon is the second collaboration album by American rapper and producer Sutter Kain with his protege Donnie Darko (also known as Darko), released in 2011.

Track listing

Samples 
"As The Beat Cries" contains a sample of "Oğluma" as performed by Cem Karaca
"Black Terrorist" contains a sample of "Persuasions Convey My Torment" as performed by Cholera
"Black Supremacy" contains a sample of "The End Of A Dark Campaign" as performed by  Oh, Sleeper
"Beats Inspired by a Bitch Pt. 2" contains a sample of "Boneyards" as performed by Parkway Drive
"Faces" contains a sample of "Family" as performed by Lamont Dozier
"City Lights" contains a sample of "Plus Fort Que Nous" as performed by Francis Lai
"Mind Right" contains a sample of "Stronger Than Us" as performed by Francis Lai
"Black Tar Heroin" contains a sample of "I'm So Afraid" as performed by Fleetwood Mac
"Back to Life" contains a sample of "Just as You Are" as performed by Ronnie Laws
"The Art of Letting Go" contains a sample of "New Low" as performed by Middle Class Rut
"Loser Pt. 8" contains a sample of "Why It Scares Me" as performed by La Dispute
"Sacrifice" contains a sample of "Busy Bein' Born" as performed by Middle Class Rut
"Land Of The Free" contains a sample of "Aspiration Flame" as performed by Mandrill

2011 albums
Horrorcore albums